The Anerastiini are a tribe of moths of the family Pyralidae.

Genera

 Acritonia Amsel, 1954
 Anacostia J. C. Shaffer, 1968
 Anchylobela Turner, 1947
 Anerastia Hübner, 1825
 Ardekania Amsel, 1951
 Ardekanopsis Amsel, 1954
 Arivaca J. C. Shaffer, 1968
 Asaluria Amsel, 1958
 Atascosa Hulst, 1890
 Baptotropa Hampson, 1918
 Calamotropa Hampson, 1918
 Chortonoeca Hampson, 1918
 Coenotropa Hampson, 1918
 Commotria Berg, 1885
 Comorta Ragonot, 1888
 Dembea Ragonot, 1888
 Discofrontia Hampson in Ragonot, 1901
 Ematheudes Zeller, 1867
 Emmalocera Ragonot, 1888
 Epidauria Rebel, 1901
 Fondoukia Chrétien, 1911
 Fossifrontia Hampson in Ragonot, 1901
 Fregenia Hartig, 1948
 Goya Ragonot, 1888
 Harnochina Dyar, 1914
 Heosphora Meyrick, 1882
 Homosassa Hulst, 1890
 Hosidia Hampson in Ragonot, 1901
 Hypsotropa Zeller, 1848
 Khachia Amsel, 1961
 Laurentia Ragonot, 1888
 Leotropa Hampson, 1918
 Lioprosopa Turner, 1947
 Maliarpha Ragonot, 1888
 Mangala Ragonot, 1888
 Menuthia Ragonot, 1888
 Mesodiphlebia Zeller, 1881
 Monoctenocera Hampson, 1899
 Navasota Ragonot, 1887
 Neorastia Amsel, 1954
 Osakia Ragonot, 1901
 Paratascosa J. C. Shaffer, 1976
 Patna Ragonot, 1888
 Peoria Ragonot, 1887
 Polyocha Zeller, 1848
 Polyochodes Chrétien, 1911
 Postemmalocera Amsel, 1955
 Praerhinaphe Amsel, 1954
 Praesaluria Amsel, 1958
 Prophtasia Ragonot, 1887
 Raphimetopus Hampson, 1918
 Reynosa J. C. Shaffer, 1968
 Saborma Ragonot, 1888
 Saluria Ragonot, 1887
 Seleucia Ragonot, 1887
 Shirazia Amsel, 1954
 Siboga Hampson in Ragonot, 1901
 Sudania Hampson in Ragonot, 1901
 Tiarra Ragonot, 1888
 Tinerastia Hampson in Ragonot, 1901
 Tolima Ragonot, 1888
 Valdovecaria Zerny, 1927
 Villiersoides Marion, 1957
 Zapalla J. C. Shaffer, 1976

References

 
Moth tribes

Taxa named by Émile Louis Ragonot
Pyralidae genera